Sophie Garbin (born 6 April 1997) is an Australian netball player. She was a member of the New South Wales Swifts teams that won the 2019 and 2021 Suncorp Super Netball titles. In 2017 she was also a member of the Western Sting team that won the Australian Netball League title. She was also a member of the Australia team that won the bronze medal at the 2018 Fast5 Netball World Series. Garbin's older sister, Darcee Garbin, is an Australia women's basketball international.

Early life, family and education 
Garbin is originally from Western Australia. Born in Kalgoorlie, she was raised in Kambalda before moving to Perth with her family when she was 13. In her youth she played both Australian rules football and basketball as well as netball. 
Between 2010 and 2014 Garbin attended Kolbe Catholic College, Rockingham. As of 2020 she is studying part time at Curtin University. Garbin's older sister, Darcee Garbin, is an Australia women's basketball international.

Playing career

Coastal Sharks
Garbin played for Coastal Sharks in the West Australian Netball League.

Western Sting
Between 2015 and 2017 Garbin played for Western Sting in the Australian Netball League. In 2017 she was a member of the Western Sting team that won the ANL title and was named MVP in the grand final. During the 2017 season, Garbin also set a new ANL goal scoring record. By round six of the competition she had surpassed the previous ANL record of 468 goals. By the end of the season she had scored 607 goals. She was subsequently named the 2017 ANL MVP.

New South Wales Swifts
In 2017 Garbin signed for New South Wales Swifts. On 29 April 2018 she made her Suncorp Super Netball for Swifts in a 2018 Round 1 match against Queensland Firebirds. Garbin scored 18 goals from 19 attempts, including a late winner which helped Swifts clinch a 54–53 win. Garbin was a member of the Swifts team that won the 2019 Suncorp Super Netball title. In the grand final she scored six goals from seven attempts as Swifts defeated Sunshine Coast Lightning 64–47.
In August 2019 Garbin renewed her Swifts contract ahead of the 2020 Suncorp Super Netball season. Garbin was named the NSW Swifts Players' Player of the Year in both 2019 and 2020.

Collingwood Magpies Netball
In September 2021, it was announced that Garbin would depart New South Wales Swifts for Collingwood Magpies.

Australia
Between 2014 and 2017 Garbin represented Australia at under-17, under-19, under-20 and under-21 levels. In October 2018 she was a member of the Australia team that won the bronze medal at the 2018 Fast5 Netball World Series. In September 2019 Garbin was included the 2019 Australian Development squad. On 3 March 2021, she made her senior debut for Australia against New Zealand during the 2021 Constellation Cup.

Honours
New South Wales Swifts
Suncorp Super Netball
Winners: 2019, 2021
Western Sting
Australian Netball League
Winners: 2017
Individual 
Australian Netball League MVP
 2017
NSW Swifts Players' Player of the Year
Winner: 2019, 2020

References

Living people
1997 births
Australian netball players
Australia international netball players
Australia international Fast5 players
Western Sting players
New South Wales Swifts players
West Australian Netball League players
Australian Netball League players
Suncorp Super Netball players
Netball players from Western Australia
Curtin University alumni
Sportspeople from Perth, Western Australia
New South Wales Institute of Sport netball players
New South Wales state netball league players
Collingwood Magpies Netball players
People from Kalgoorlie